Milo Yiannopoulos (born Milo Hanrahan, 18 October 1984), who has also published as Milo Andreas Wagner and the mononym Milo, is a British alt-right political commentator. His speeches and writings criticize Islam, feminism, social justice, and political correctness. Yiannopoulos is a former editor for Breitbart News, an American far-right media organisation.

Yiannopoulos worked for far-right news organization Breitbart from 2014 until 2017. During this time, Yiannopoulos rose to prominence as a significant voice in the Gamergate controversy. In July 2016, he was permanently banned from Twitter for online harassment of actress Leslie Jones. He was permanently banned from Facebook in 2019. According to emails by Yiannopoulos leaked by BuzzFeed News in late 2017, Yiannopoulos solicited white nationalists, such as American Renaissance editor Devin Saucier, for story ideas and editing suggestions during his tenure at Breitbart.

Yiannopoulos has been accused of advocating paedophilia. The allegation arose from several video clips in which he said that sexual relationships between 13-year-old boys and adult men and women can be "perfectly consensual" and positive experiences for the boys. Following the release of the video clips, Yiannopoulos resigned from his position at Breitbart, his invitation to speak before the Conservative Political Action Conference (CPAC) was revoked, and a contract to publish his autobiography with Simon & Schuster was cancelled. Yiannopoulos has said that he is not a supporter of paedophilic relationships and that his statements were merely attempts to cope with his own victimhood, as an object of child abuse by unnamed older men.

In 2022, Yiannopoulos served as an intern for Georgia Congresswoman Marjorie Taylor Greene, then worked with musician Kanye West on his 2024 presidential election bid.

Early and personal life
Born as Milo Hanrahan, Yiannopoulos was  born and raised in Chatham, Kent, England. His father is of half-Greek and half-Irish descent and his mother is Jewish. He is described as a practising Roman Catholic. His parents divorced when he was a child.

Raised by his mother and her second husband, Yiannopoulos has stated that he did not have a good relationship with his stepfather. As a teenager, Yiannopoulos lived with his paternal grandmother whose surname, Yiannopoulos, he later adopted.

Yiannopoulos was educated at Simon Langton Grammar School for Boys in Canterbury from which he has said he was expelled. He attended the University of Manchester but dropped out before graduating; he then read English at Wolfson College, Cambridge, but was sent down (expelled) in 2010.

In 2017, Yiannopoulos was a U.S. resident alien on O-1 visa status. He married his long-term boyfriend in Hawaii in September 2017. In March 2021, during an interview with right-wing publication LifeSiteNews, Yiannopoulos claimed to be "ex-gay" and stated his husband had been "demoted to housemate".

In August 2021, Yiannopoulos claimed that he tested positive for COVID-19 and implied that he used ivermectin to treat himself, despite the Food and Drug Administration (FDA) and medical professionals warning against using the medication as a treatment for COVID-19.

Career

After he dropped out of university, Yiannopoulos initially secured a job at The Catholic Herald. In 2009, Yiannopoulos moved to technology journalism with The Daily Telegraph. His Telegraph columnist bio described him in 2009 as one who "writes sceptically about Web 2.0 and social media but enthusiastically about the internet in general."

In June 2022, Yiannopoulos became an unpaid intern for Republican politician Marjorie Taylor Greene.

The Kernel 
In November 2011, Yiannopoulos co-founded The Kernel. In March 2013, The Kernel was shut down amidst allegations of unpaid wages, at a time when Yiannopoulos was the Editor-in-Chief and sole director of the parent company, Sentinel Media. It was reopened later that year under Kernel Media, with Yiannopoulos remaining Editor-in-Chief and having privately settled the previous debts.

In 2014, The Kernel was acquired by Daily Dot Media, the parent company of The Daily Dot. After the acquisition by Daily Dot Media, Yiannopoulos stepped down as editor-in-chief, although he remained an adviser to the company.

Breitbart News 

In 2014, Yiannopoulos started writing for Breitbart News, and in October 2015, Breitbart placed Yiannopoulos in charge of its new "Breitbart Tech" section. The site had six full-time staff, including esports specialist Richard Lewis, and was edited by Yiannopoulos until his resignation on 21 February 2017.

Gamergate 

In 2014, Yiannopoulos emerged as a "lead actor" in the Gamergate harassment campaign through his work at Breitbart, becoming one of the most vocal of Gamergate's supporters. Yiannopoulos employed Gamergate as a basis for online attacks on women, and his role in Gamergate allowed him to become one of the central figures in the mainstream growth of the alt-right. Before Gamergate, Yiannopoulos referred to gamers as "pungent beta male bollock scratchers" and also said that "Few things are more embarrassing than grown men getting over-excited about video games".

Association with neo-Nazism and the alt-right 
In early October 2017, BuzzFeed News published leaked email chains from Yiannopoulos' tenure at Breitbart. According to the report, Yiannopoulos and his ghostwriter Allum Bokhari regularly solicited ideas for stories and comments from people associated with the alt-right and neo-Nazi movements. Among the figures Yiannopoulos contacted were Curtis Yarvin, a central figure of the neoreactionary movement; Devin Saucier, the editor of the white supremacist magazine American Renaissance; Andrew Auernheimer, the administrator of neo-Nazi website The Daily Stormer; and Baked Alaska, a commentator known for his antisemitic and pro-Nazi tweets.

The story also reported that Yiannopoulos had a penchant for using personal passwords with antisemitic overtones, such as 'Kristall', a reference to Kristallnacht and 'longknives1290', a compound reference to the Night of the Long Knives and the Edict of Expulsion.

In a Breitbart article, Yiannopoulos and a co-author described the alt-right movement as "dangerously bright". The Tablet stated that many of these intellectual backers write for publications it describes as racist and antisemitic, such as VDARE and American Renaissance. The Breitbart article was criticised by opponents of the alt-right for excusing the extremist elements of the movement, and also by the neo-Nazi website The Daily Stormer which holds that racism and antisemitism are pillars of the alt-right.

The Anti-Defamation League classifies Yiannopoulos as part of the alt-lite, a term used to distinguish individuals sometimes associated with the alt-right from those who are openly white nationalist and antisemitic. These accusations, as well as Yiannopoulos's support for Donald Trump, have contributed to a feud between Yiannopoulos and Ben Shapiro, a Jewish conservative political commentator who refused to support Trump in the 2016 presidential election. Shapiro accused Yiannopoulos, his followers, and other Trump supporters of racist and antisemitic behaviour. He criticized Yiannopoulos's attempts to distinguish between real racist or bigoted behaviour and trolling, stating that "words have meaning" and that the distinction that Yiannopoulos was attempting to make "simply doesn't exist in objective reality".

In 2017, Yiannopoulos was caught on camera singing "America the Beautiful" at a karaoke bar, where a crowd of neo-Nazis and white supremacists, including Richard B. Spencer, who cheered him with the Nazi sieg heil salute. Yiannopoulos subsequently claimed that he did not see the Nazi salutes while he was singing, citing what he claimed to be "extreme myopia". According to the bartender who was working on the night of the incident, Yiannopoulos, Spencer and their entourage came into the bar and asked to sing karaoke even though it had ended. When the bartender saw the Nazi salutes she rushed the stage and told Yiannopoulos and his friends to leave, at which point they began harassing her, chanting "Trump! Trump! Trump!" and "Make America Great Again!" According to her, Yiannopoulos was getting the others "roused".

Following these revelations, billionaire Robert Mercer ceased his support for Yiannopoulos and condemned him, as did Yiannopoulos's former employer Steve Bannon.

In November 2019, Yiannopoulos released an audio recording which appeared to feature Spencer using racist slurs against African Americans and Jewish people. The recording appeared to date from the immediate aftermath of the Unite the Right rally in Charlottesville in 2017 and the murder of Heather Heyer.

Tours 

Yiannopoulos has appeared on a number of controversial tours. Beginning in 2015 with "The Dangerous Faggot Tour", encompassing universities in the United States and Great Britain. Although few of his American speeches were cancelled, many were met with protests ranging from vocal disruptions to violent demonstrations. Yiannopoulos has had visas denied or cancelled on multiple occasions.

In January 2017, Yiannopoulos spoke at the University of Washington. The event led to large protests. A 34-year-old man was shot while protesting and suffered life-threatening injuries. A witness recalled seeing someone release pepper spray in the crowd, which triggered the shooting confrontation.

On 1 February 2017, Yiannopoulos was scheduled to make a speech at UC Berkeley. More than 100 UC Berkeley faculty had signed a petition urging the university to cancel the event. Over 1,500 people gathered to protest against the event on the steps of Sproul Hall, with some violence breaking out. According to the university, around 150 masked agitators came onto campus and interrupted the protest, setting fires, damaging property, throwing fireworks, attacking members of the crowd, and throwing rocks at the police. These violent protesters included members of BAMN, who threw rocks at police, shattered windows, threw Molotov cocktails, and later vandalised downtown Berkeley. Among those assaulted were a Syrian Muslim in a suit who was pepper sprayed and hit with a rod by a protester who said "You look like a Nazi", and a woman who was pepper sprayed while being interviewed by a TV reporter. Citing security concerns, the UC Police Department cancelled the event. One person was arrested for failure to disperse, and there was about $100,000 in damage. The police were criticised for their "hands off" policy whereby they did not arrest any of the demonstrators who committed assault, vandalism, or arson. Berkeley police reported at least 11 arrests, but no injuries or damage to buildings. UC Berkeley spokesman Dan Mogulof said afterwards that the media event amounted to "the most expensive photo op in the university's history."

In November 2017, Yiannopoulos began a tour of Australia, visiting Sydney, Melbourne, Gold Coast, Adelaide and Perth. During the Adelaide show, Yiannopoulos stirred controversy by projecting an unflattering photo of the feminist writer Clementine Ford, taken when she was a teenager, with the words "UNFUCKABLE" superimposed over the top. During events in Melbourne, he again stirred controversy when he described Australian Aboriginal art as "crap" and "really shit". There was violence outside his Melbourne events as protesters from the left-aligned Campaign Against Racism and Fascism and right-wing True Blue Crew clashed. Seven people were arrested after clashing with police and outside the venue for Yiannopoulos's Sydney event. Yiannopoulos claimed the violence was caused by "the left, showing up, being violent to stop freedom of speech".

Books 
Yiannopoulos published two poetry books under the name Milo Andreas Wagner. His 2007 release Eskimo Papoose was later scrutinised for re-using lines from pop music and television without attribution, to which he replied that it was done deliberately and that the work was satirical.

Dangerous 

A ghostwritten autobiography titled Dangerous was announced in December 2016. Yiannopoulos received an $80,000 advance payment from the book's planned publisher, Simon & Schuster. It was intended to be published under their Threshold Editions. A day after its announcement, pre-sales for the book elevated it to first place on Amazon.com's list of best-sellers.

In February 2017, Simon & Schuster cancelled its plans to publish the book in the wake of the video and sexual-consent comments controversy that also led to CPAC withdrawing its speaking invitation and Yiannopoulos resigning from Breitbart. Yiannopoulos began litigation against Simon & Schuster for "breach of contract" and "breach of the covenant of good faith and fair dealing", seeking $10 million in damages. He dropped the suit in February 2018.

In May 2017, Yiannopoulos announced that he would self-publish the book on 4 July 2017. Soon after the announcement, the book became the best-selling political humour book on Amazon. The book was a New York Times, Wall Street Journal and USA Today bestseller. The book further peaked at No. 1 on Publishers Weeklys nonfiction bestseller list and at No. 2 on the New York Times nonfiction bestseller list.

Subsequent publications

Yiannopoulos published the book Diabolical: How Pope Francis Has Betrayed Clerical Abuse Victims Like Me – and Why He Has to Go in 2018. He stated: "The main purpose of writing this new book was to talk about the homosexual cancer that has infected the Vatican". The book repeated the discredited claim that paedophilia and homosexuality are linked. Yiannopoulos promoted the book through Michael Voris, a traditionalist Catholic, celibate bisexual and anti-LGBT activist.
Yiannopoulos's self-published books How to Be Poor and How to Be Straight were also released in 2019. The former was released after the revelation of his alleged insolvency.

Controversies

Social media controversies and bans
In December 2015, Twitter briefly suspended Yiannopoulos' account after he changed his profile to describe himself as BuzzFeeds "social justice editor." His Twitter account's blue "verification" checkmark was removed by the site the following month. Twitter declined to give an explanation for the removal of verification, saying that they do not comment on individual cases. Some news outlets speculated that Yiannopoulos had violated its speech and harassment codes, as with an instance where he told another user that they "deserved to be harassed." Others worried that Twitter was targeting conservatives.

For his criticism of Islam, his Twitter account was briefly suspended in June 2016. His account was later restored.

In July 2016, Yiannopoulos panned the Ghostbusters reboot as "a movie to help lonely middle-aged women feel better about being left on the shelf." After the film's release, Twitter trolls attacked African-American actress Leslie Jones with racist slurs and bigoted commentary. Yiannopoulos wrote three public tweets about Jones, saying "Ghostbusters is doing so badly they've deployed [Leslie Jones] to play the victim on Twitter," before describing her reply to him as "barely literate" and then calling her a "black dude". Multiple media outlets have described Yiannopoulos' tweets as encouraging the abuse directed at Jones. Yiannopoulos was then permanently banned by Twitter for what the company cited as "inciting or engaging in the targeted abuse or harassment of others". He later stated that he was banned because of his conservative beliefs.

In May 2019, Yiannopoulos and several others active in politics and culture, including Nation of Islam leader Louis Farrakhan and conspiracy theorists and fellow right-wing pundits Alex Jones and Paul Joseph Watson, were permanently banned from Facebook, which called them "dangerous." "We've always banned individuals or organizations that promote or engage in violence and hate, regardless of ideology," a Facebook spokesperson said. "The process for evaluating potential violators is extensive and it is what led us to our decision to remove these accounts today."

Yiannopoulos Privilege Grant 
In January 2016, Yiannopoulos set up his Privilege Grant for white men to balance scholarships for women and minorities. He participated in an online telethon to raise money for the grant and in August 2016, reported that approximately $100,000 had been received in donations and a further $250,000 had been pledged.

In August 2016, it was revealed that over a quarter of a million dollars had gone missing from the Yiannopoulos Privilege Grant. Yiannopoulos apologised for mismanaging the grant and denied that he had spent the money. In March 2018, Yiannopoulos confirmed that the fund had been closed down.

In July 2022, Lauren Southern alleged that the mismanagement claims were false, and that instead the money had been transferred to Milo Yiannopolos.

Remarks on paedophilia and child sexual abuse 
In February 2017, it was announced that Yiannopoulos would address the Conservative Political Action Conference (CPAC). A conservative website, Reagan Battalion, then posted video of 2015 and 2016 clips of YouTube interviews at the request of a 16-year-old Canadian student who was opposed to Yiannopoulos' CPAC address.

In the interview from a January 2016 episode of the podcast Drunken Peasants, Yiannopoulos stated that sexual relationships between 13-year-old boys and adult men and women can "happen perfectly consensually", because some 13-year-olds are, in his view, sexually and emotionally mature enough to consent to sex with adults; he spoke favourably both of gay 13-year-old boys having sex with adult men and straight 13-year-old boys having sex with adult women. He used his own experience as an example, saying he was mature enough to be capable of giving consent at a young age. He also stated that "paedophilia is not a sexual attraction to somebody 13 years old, who is sexually mature" but rather that "paedophilia is attraction to children who have not reached puberty." Later in the interview, after his previous comments received some pushback from the hosts, he stated: "I think the age of consent law is probably about right, that is probably roughly the right age ... but there are certainly people who are capable of giving consent at a younger age, I certainly consider myself to be one of them."

Yiannopoulos subsequently held a press conference, at which he said he had been the victim of child abuse, and that his comments were a way to cope with it. He declined to identify his abusers or discuss the incidents in any detail. He characterised his comments as the "usual blend of British sarcasm, provocation and gallows humour", and dismissed the allegation that he endorses child molestation. He alleged that the video had been edited to give a misleading impression, and stated, "I will not apologise for dealing with my life experiences in the best way that I can, which is humour. No one can tell me or anyone else who has lived through sexual abuse how to deal with those emotions. But I am sorry to other abuse victims if my own personal way of dealing with what happened to me has hurt you." In response to the controversy, Simon & Schuster cancelled its plans to publish his autobiography in June 2017. Media outlets reported on 20 February that Breitbart was considering terminating Yiannopoulos' contract as a result of the controversy. Yiannopoulos resigned from Breitbart on 21 February, reportedly under pressure to do so.

Yiannopoulos was later criticised for attending Hollywood "boat parties" and "house parties" in which boys he described as "very young – very young" were sexually abused, but failing to report the abusers to the authorities or to identify them during an appearance on The Joe Rogan Experience. When asked about this by Ryan Lizza of New York magazine, Yiannopoulos said he "didn't check anyone's I.D.s." and that he "had no idea what the ages of any of those people at the parties were." He stated that when he said "very young" he was assuming that they were sixteen or seventeen. He reiterated that he doesn't "advocate for any illegal behavior" or excuse it. When, on 10 March, an additional video emerged in which he said on a 2015 episode of Gavin McInnes's show that child sexual abuse is "really not that big a deal. You can't let it ruin your life," Yiannopoulos was criticized for mocking child sexual abuse victims by calling them "whinging selfish brats" for "suddenly" remembering they were abused and "suddenly" deciding it was a problem 20 years after the abuse occurred. He also stated that a disproportionate number of paedophiles are homosexual.

Violence against journalists
In 2018, Yiannopoulos told at least two news organisations who had requested comments that he wanted vigilantes to shoot journalists. He wrote in a text message "I can't wait for vigilante squads to start gunning journalists down on sight". Two days later, following a shooting at the Capital Gazette in Annapolis, Maryland, in which five people were killed, Yiannopoulos denied that his comments were responsible, adding that his remarks were a joke. He later posted on Instagram that he sent the messages to troll journalists. On Facebook he wrote: "You're about to see a raft of news stories claiming that I am responsible for inspiring the deaths of journalists." and "The truth, as always, is the opposite of what the media tells you."

In October 2018, following several instances in which pipe bombs had been sent to Trump critics, Yiannopoulos posted the following comment on Instagram: "Just catching up with news of all these pipe bombs. Disgusting and sad (that they didn't go off, and the daily beast didn't get one)". After initially refusing to remove the comment when it was reported as hate speech, Instagram later deleted the post.

Political views
In the United Kingdom, Yiannopoulos supported the Conservative Party before applying to join the UK Independence Party in June 2018. 

A former supporter of Donald Trump, and a person who was compared to Ann Coulter, he has been referred to as the "face of a political movement," but he says his real concerns are "pop culture and free speech." In December 2020, Yiannopoulos denounced Trump, saying that "Trump's SCOTUS appointments were pointless. We defended a selfish clown for nothing," and that he would dedicate "the rest of my life to the destruction of the Republican Party." In 2022, he briefly worked with musician Kanye West on his 2024 presidential election bid. Yiannopoulos claimed that he arranged the November 2022 dinner between Trump, West and far-right commentator Nick Fuentes to "make Trump's life miserable".

Islam 
Yiannopoulos is a frequent critic of Islam and has said the "fear of Islam is entirely rational". He has blamed Islam for violence against women and homosexuals and not extremists groups and terrorists. Yiannopoulos said "I'm not talking about Islamists. I'm not talking about terrorists. I'm not talking about radical Islam. I'm talking about mainstream Muslim culture. There are eleven Muslim countries in which I could be killed for being a homosexual. The state penalty is death. One hundred million people live in countries where the penalty for homosexuality is death. This is not radical Islam. This is mainstream Muslim society. Look what's happening in Sweden. Look what's happening anywhere in Germany, anywhere there are large influxes of a Muslim population. Things don't end well for women and gays. The left has got to make a decision. Either they want female emancipation and it wants gay rights or it wants Islam. It's got to pick".

Following the June 2016 Orlando nightclub shooting, he claimed that all of Islam, not simply a small group of radicals, was responsible for mistreating women and homosexuals. After Yiannopolos was nominated to become to be the rector at the Russell Group, Milo said he would protect LGBTQ students by shutting down the Muslim Students Association. Shortly after the Manchester Arena bombing, Yiannopolos strongly criticized singer Ariana Grande characterizing her as pro Islam and said "Sadly, Ariana Grande is too stupid to wise up and warn her European fans about the real threats to their freedom and their lives. She will remain ferociously pro-immigrant, pro-Islam and anti-America. Makes you wonder whether they bombed to attack her or in solidarity".  

Yiannopoulos described social attitudes of Western Muslims as "horribly regressive." He has attempted to distinguish his opposition to Muslim immigration into the West from racism. After the 2019 Christchurch mosque shootings, Yiannopoulos said that he condemned the violence but wrote on Facebook that attacks like that happen "because the establishment panders to and mollycoddles extremist leftism and barbaric, alien religious cultures." He was widely criticized for this description and banned from making an intended speaking tour in Australia in 2019.

Women and feminism
Yiannopoulos is a frequent critic of feminism and "dumpy lesbians". He has frequently written articles that have been criticised as misogynistic. In a Breitbart article titled "Birth Control Makes Women Unattractive and Crazy", he asserts that the combined oral contraceptive pill causes women to become hysterical, sexually promiscuous and obese. He declared his birthday "World Patriarchy Day". In 2016, Yiannopoulos published a Breitbart article entitled "Would You Rather Your Child Had Feminism Or Cancer?"

He describes feminists as "easy to wind up", is critical of the idea of a gender pay gap and claims that feminism has become "a mean, vindictive, sociopathic, man-hating movement." Yiannopoulos favours banning women from military combat units.

In January 2018, Yiannopoulos reported a fictitious news story, written by a spoof news site, as being true. The article claimed that an English High Court had ruled that the National Health Service was legally obliged to offer cervical smear tests to men. Unaware that the story was satire, Yiannopoulos argued that the story exemplified the thinking of those living in "feminist clown world". Before reading out the article verbatim, Yiannopoulos insisted that he had researched the story and promised that "this is real, I haven't just made this up".

LGBT rights
In 2011, Yiannopoulos described being gay as "a lifestyle choice guaranteed to bring [gay people] pain and unhappiness." In October 2017, he married his husband in Hawaii. That same month, he came out against the Australian Marriage Law Postal Survey, arguing it would violate religious freedom.

In 2017, Yiannopoulos reiterated his belief that homosexuality is a sin and denounced those (including clergy) who sought to change Church dogma on the issue. "You don't see me disputing the Church's teachings on homosexuality...I wouldn't dream of demanding that the Church throw away her hard truths just to lie to me in hopes I’ll feel better about myself," he said. In August 2019, Yiannopoulos was grand marshal for a straight pride parade in Boston, organized by a group called Super Happy Fun America. The parade was ostensibly to celebrate heterosexuality.

In March 2021, despite having told Super Happy Fun America organizers in a conference call that "there are no ex-gays," Yiannopoulos declared to the LifeSiteNews website that he was an ex-gay and would begin advocating on behalf of improving the public image of gay conversion therapy. In June 2021, Yiannopoulos announced that he was fundraising for a gay conversion therapy centre in Florida.

Debt
In December 2018, his former Australian tour promoters, Australian Events Management, showed that Yiannopoulos had accrued more than $2 million in unpaid debt: $1.6 million to his own company, $400,000 to the Mercer Family Foundation, $153,215 to his former lawyers, $76,574 to former collaborator and Breitbart writer Allum Bokhari, and $20,000 to the luxury brand Cartier.

Books
 
 
 How to Be Poor. 2019. 
 How to Be Straight. 2019. 
 Middle Rages: Why the Battle for Medieval Studies Matters to America. 2019. 
 The Trial of Roger Stone. 2020. 

Forewords
 SJWs Always Lie—Taking Down the Thought Police. 2015. Castalia Press. 
 Forbidden Thoughts. 2017. Subversive Press. 
 Jordanetics: A Journey into the Mind of Humanity’s Greatest Thinker. 2018. Castelia Press.

See also
Rachel Fulton Brown, academic at the University of Chicago

References

External links

 
 
 
 

1984 births
Living people
20th-century British people
21st-century British writers
21st-century Roman Catholics
Alt-right writers
Alumni of the University of Manchester
Alumni of Wolfson College, Cambridge
Breitbart London
Breitbart News people
British autobiographers
British chief executives
British columnists
British critics of Islam
British male journalists
British mass media company founders
British people of Greek descent
British people of Irish descent
British people of Jewish descent
British poets
British political writers
British Roman Catholic writers
British social commentators
Conservatism in the United Kingdom
Conservative Party (UK) people
Conversion therapy
Critics of atheism
Discrimination against LGBT people in the United States
Free speech activists
Far-right politics in the United Kingdom
Male critics of feminism
Anti-Islam sentiment in the United Kingdom
People educated at Simon Langton Grammar School for Boys
People involved in plagiarism controversies
People from Chatham, Kent
People self-identified as ex-gay
Technology journalists
Twitter controversies
UK Independence Party people
21st-century pseudonymous writers
LGBT conservatism